There are at least 2 places in India called Singri. One in South India, in the state of Tamil Nadu, close to the city of Vellore. This place is also referred to as Singiri or "Singri". There is a 1000-year-old temple built in the honor of Lord Lakshmi Narasimha (Nara=Human, Simha=Lion).  There is a pratiti (nearest equivalent is a historic fact) that Lord took the form of a half lion and half human to defeat an asura (Demon) who had a boon that no man or beast can kill him. Since he got the boon, however, he had become too proud and condescending toward everyone and troubled them in every possible way. So people prayed to the lord for help when Lord took the form of Narasimha. The statue is amazingly beautiful and witness to the skills of the artists of that day.  The place is situated far from all the commotions of a city, reflecting the need for peace sought by every human being.

The second and a beautiful place is situated on the bank of river Brahmaputra, in Sonitpur district, Assam. Main attraction of the place is Gupteswar temple. As mentioned by the great master Jigme Lingpa in the 18th century, Singri has been the pilgrimage site for Tibetans and Bhutanese, since the 14th century.

Villages in Sonitpur district